The Military and Cultural Institute of National Defense University, People's Liberation Army, previously the People's Liberation Army Academy of Art (colloquially known as Junyi 军艺), is an academic institute of the PLA National Defense University in Haidian District, Beijing, China. It has one campus, consisting of 7 departments and 12 specialties.

History
The PLA Academy of Art was founded in May 1960. It was revoked in October 1969, during the Cultural Revolution. In May 1976, Hua Guofeng and Ye Jianying toppled the Gang of Four, two years later, the university was rebuilt. In 2017, the previous PLA Academy changed name to The Military and Cultural Institute, National Defense University PLA. The current chairman of the institute is Zhang Qichao.

Departments
 Department of Literature
 Department of Arts
 Department of Drama
 Department of Music
 Department of Dance
 Department of Troop Culture 
 Department of Literature Administration

Notable alumni
Note that class year indicates the entrance year, not graduating year.

Department of Dance
Class of 1979 : Jin Xing
Class of 1993 : Ma Su
Class of 2003 : Yang Yang
Unknown class : Dong Jie

Department of Drama
Class of 1979 : Liu Peiqi
Class of 1999 : Yin Tao

Unknown class : Xu Lu, Wu Gang, Xu Dongdong

Department of Music
Class of 2003 : Alan Dawa Dolma
Unknown class : Chen Sisi, Han Hong, Tan Jing

Department of Troop Culture
Unknown class : Liu Jing

Unknown Department
Dai Yuqiang
Lin Yongjian
Liu Lili
Liu Yuanyuan
Mo Yan
Qian Gang
Sa Dingding
Wang Hongwei
Yan Ni

Notable faculty
 
 Peng Liyuan

See also
 CPC Central Military Commission Political Department Song and Dance Troupe

References

Universities and colleges in Beijing
Educational institutions established in 1960
1960 establishments in China
Military academies of China